Citrobacter is a genus of Gram-negative coliform bacteria in the family Enterobacteriaceae.

The species C. amalonaticus, C. koseri, and C. freundii can use citrate as a sole carbon source. Citrobacter species are differentiated by their ability to convert tryptophan to indole (C. koseri is the only citrobacter to be commonly indole-positive), ferment lactose (C. koseri is a lactose fermentor), and use malonate.

Citrobacter shows the ability to accumulate uranium by building phosphate complexes.

Clinical significance
These bacteria can be found almost everywhere in soil, water, wastewater, etc. They can also be found in the human intestine. They are rarely the source of illnesses, except for infections of the GI Tract, urinary tract and infant meningitis and sepsis.

Citrobacter freundii strains have inducible ampC genes encoding resistance to ampicillin and first-generation cephalosporins. In addition, isolates of Citrobacter may be resistant to many other antibiotics as a result of plasmid-encoded resistance genes.

References

External links
 Citrobacter at DSMZ - German Collection of Microorganisms and Cell Cultures
 Canada Public Health Data Sheet

 
Bacteria genera